WEXZ-LD, virtual channel 13 (VHF digital channel 5), is a low-powered Retro TV-affiliated television station licensed to Bangor, Maine, United States. The station is owned by Station X, Inc. WEXZ-LD's transmitter is located on Spring Street in Dexter, Maine.

History 
The station's construction permit was issued on March 27, 2012 under the calls of W05DF-D. The callsign changed to the current WEXZ-LD on November 11, 2015.

Digital channels
The station's digital signal is multiplexed:

References 

Television channels and stations established in 2012
2012 establishments in Maine
Retro TV affiliates
Low-power television stations in the United States
EXZ-LD